The University of Sussex is a public research university located in Falmer, East Sussex, England, it is mostly within the city boundaries of Brighton and Hove but extends into the Lewes District in its eastern fringe. The university received its Royal Charter in August 1961, the first of the plate glass university generation.

More than a third of its students are enrolled in postgraduate programmes and approximately a third of staff are from outside the United Kingdom. Sussex has a diverse community of nearly 20,000 students, with around one in three being foreign students, and over 1,000 academics, representing over 140 different nationalities. The annual income of the institution for 2021–22 was £345.2 million with an expenditure of £377.4 million.

Sussex counts 5 Nobel Prize winners, 15 Fellows of the Royal Society, 10 Fellows of the British Academy, 24 fellows of the Academy of Social Sciences and a winner of the Crafoord Prize among its faculty. By 2011, many of its faculty members had also received the Royal Society of Literature Prize, the Order of the British Empire and the Bancroft Prize. Alumni include heads of states, diplomats, politicians, eminent scientists and activists.

History

20th century
In an effort to establish a university to serve Sussex, a public meeting was held in December 1911 at the Royal Pavilion in Brighton to discover ways to fund the construction of a university; the project was halted by World War I, and the money raised was used instead for books for the Municipal Technical College.

The idea was revived in the 1950s,  and in June 1958 the government approved the corporation's scheme for a university at Brighton, to be the first of a new generation of what came to be known as plate glass universities. The university was established as a company in 1959, with a Royal Charter being granted on 16 August 1961. This was the first university to be established in the UK since the Second World War, apart from Keele University. The university's organisation broke new ground in seeing the campus divided into Schools of Study, with students able to benefit from a multidisciplinary teaching environment. Sussex would emphasise cross-disciplinary activity, so that students would emerge from the university with a range of background or 'contextual' knowledge to complement their specialist 'core' skills in a particular subject area. For example, arts students spent their first year taking sciences while science students took arts.

The university quickly grew, starting with 52 students in 1961–62 to 3,200 in 1967–68. After starting at Knoyle Hall in Brighton, the Falmer campus was gradually built with Falmer House opening in 1962. Its campus was praised as gorgeously modernist and groundbreaking, receiving numerous awards. Its Student Union was quite active, organising events and concerts. Performers like Pink Floyd, Jimi Hendrix and Chuck Berry repeatedly performed at the University Common Room, giving the university a reputation for Rock and Roll.

Academically, Sussex was home to figures such as Asa Lord Briggs, Helmut Pappe, Gillian Rose, Jennifer Platt and Tom Bottomore. In its first years, the university attracted a number of renowned academics such as Sir John Cornforth, John Maynard Smith, Martin Wight, David Daiches, Roger Blin-Stoyle and Colin Eaborn. Similarly, renowned scholars like Marcus Cunliffe, Gabriel Josipovici, Quentin Bell, Dame Helen Wallace, Stuart Sutherland and Marie Jahoda also became central figures at the university and founded many of its current departments. Additionally, a number of initiatives at the university were started at this time, such as the Subaltern Studies Group.

In the late 1960s, the United Nations asked for science policy recommendations from a team of renowned academics at Sussex. The ensuing report became known as the Sussex Manifesto.

Sussex came to be identified with student radicalism. In 1973, a group of students prevented United States government adviser Samuel P. Huntington from giving a speech on campus, because of his involvement in the Vietnam War. Similarly, when the spokesperson for the US embassy, Robert Beers, visited to give a talk to students entitled 'Vietnam in depth' three students were waiting outside Falmer House and threw a bucket of red paint over the diplomat as he was leaving.

In both 1967 and 1969, Sussex won the television quiz University Challenge.

In 1980, Sussex edged out the University of Oxford to become the university with the highest income from research grants and contracts.

21st century

In an attempt to appeal to a modern audience, the university chose in 2004 to cease using its coat of arms and to replace it with the "US" logo.

In 2011, Sussex celebrated its 50th anniversary and saw the production of a number of works including a book on the university's history and an oral history and photography project. The university launched its first major fundraising campaign, Making the Future, and gathered over £51.3 million.

The university underwent a number of changes with the Sussex Strategic Plan 2009–2015, including the introduction of new academic courses, the opening of new research centres, the renovation and refurbishment of a number of its schools and buildings as well as the ongoing expansion of its student housing facilities. The university has spent over £100 million on-campus redevelopment, which is ongoing with £500 million planned to be spent by the 2021.

Sussex is heavily involved with the larger community across England, especially in East Sussex. There are many regular community projects, such as children's activity camps, the Neighbourhood scheme, the community ambassador programme and Street Cleans. Local residents can receive free legal advice from Sussex's law school and get guidance on renting through Sussex's Rent Smart program. The university also facilitates volunteering opportunities for a number of local and international organizations. The university also offers language courses for the public through its Sussex Centre for Language Studies. The university runs the Sussex Conversations program, a media platform seeking to disseminate research to the wider community.

In 2015–16, the university generated more than £407 million to the UK economy, with over £74.9 million in tax receipts.

In September 2017, the university appointed Saul Becker as its first Provost and Jayne Aldridge as its first permanent Director for the Student Experience. These changes come as part of a number of structural changes the university has been introducing in the past years.

In 2018, the university moved all of its investments out of fossil fuels (known as fossil fuel divestment) after a four-year student union run campaign.

In October 2021 a student campaign called for Kathleen Stock's dismissal. In October 2021, the university's vice-chancellor Professor Adam Tickell gave his support to Stock who has been accused of transphobia. The Times reported students have called for Stock's dismissal and claimed that she has been victimised. Following Tickell's statement, the Sussex branch of the University and College Union (UCU) called for an investigation into "institutional transphobia" at the University of Sussex. Students have accused the university management of being "anti-student and pro-transphobia." Taiwo Owatemi, the Shadow Minister for Women and Equalities, called UCU's statement "strong and principled."

In 2021, during the COVID-19 pandemic, Sussex was one of few universities that returned to real-world teaching. Most lectures at other universities chose to remain online-only.

Campus

Sussex is situated near the city of Brighton and Hove, and surrounded by the South Downs National Park. It is the only English university to be located in a National Park. The campus is also close to Lewes and is approximately an hour away from London.

The campus, designed by Sir Basil Spence, is next to the village of Falmer but mostly within the city boundaries of Brighton and Hove. It is close to the South Downs, which influenced Spence's design of the campus. In 1959, the Basil Spence and Partners company began planning and designing the campus, to be built over a 15-year period. In 1971, 17 buildings had been designed and built winning numerous awards including a medal from the Royal Institute of British Architects and a Civic Trust award.

Spence expressed his awe at the beauty of the surrounding region and designed the campus as a stream of low buildings so as not to disturb the natural scenery around. Brick was chosen throughout as it was the dominant material used across Sussex.

As the campus developed, Spence connected the buildings by a series of 'green, interlocking courtyards that Spence felt created a sense of enclosure'.

Today the campus is self-contained, with facilities including eights cafes/restaurants, a post office, a Co-op Food store, a market, a bank, a pharmacy, a health centre (including a dentist) and childcare facilities.
Spence's designs were appreciated by architects; many of the campus buildings won awards. A number of features define these buildings, including the materials used and the fact that many of them have planted and tree-filled courtyards. The gatehouse-inspired Falmer House won a bronze medal from the Royal Institute of British Architects. Another campus building, The Meeting House, won the Civic Trust award in 1969. In 1993, the buildings which made up the core of Spence's designs were given listed building status, with Falmer House being one of only two buildings to be given a Grade 1 status of "exceptional interest". A number of the original buildings are now Grade I listed buildings, the first time university buildings in England become listed.

Sussex laid claim to being the "only English university located entirely within a designated Area of Outstanding Natural Beauty". It is now entirely surrounded by the newly founded South Downs National Park.

The Gardner Arts Centre, another of Basil Spence's designs, was opened in 1969 as the first university campus arts centre. It had a 480-seat purpose-built theatre, a visual art gallery and studio space, and was frequently used for theatre and dance as well as showing a range of films on a modern cinema screen. The Centre closed in the summer of 2007: withdrawal of funding and the cost of renovating the building were given as the key reasons. Following an extensive refurbishment, the Centre reopened as the Attenborough Centre for the Creative Arts (ACCA) in the autumn of 2015, and a public performance programme started in Spring 2016. The centre is now a national arts and performance hub hosting various kinds of performances year-round.

The campus has facilities such as the Genome Damage and Stability Centre; the medical imaging equipment at the Brighton and Sussex Medical School (BSMS); and the university's Library, until 2013 the home of the Mass Observation Archive, which relocated to The Keep, a purpose-built archive facility nearby.

Library

The university's main library is at the centre of its campus. It was opened by Queen Elizabeth II on 13 November 1964. The Royal Literary fund office is based at the Library, providing support for students around academic writing. The Library also houses a research support centre and a research hive for PhD students and research staff. There is also a Skills Hub, training facilities, a support centre, a café and a Careers and Employability Centre.

There are also smaller libraries within individual schools and research centres, as well as The Keep.

The university holds a number of acclaimed collections and archives, mostly related to twentieth-century literary, political and cultural history. Collections include original manuscripts and first editions by Virginia Woolf, Jane Austen and Rudyard Kipling as well as The New Statesman Archive and the Mass-Observation Archive.

Organisation and administration

Schools of Studies
The university was founded with the unusual structure of "Schools of Study" (ubiquitously abbreviated to "schools") rather than traditional university departments within arts and science faculties.

In the early 1990s, the university promoted the system by claiming "[c]lusters of faculty [come] together within schools to pursue new areas of intellectual enquiry. The schools also foster broader intellectual links. Physics with Management Studies, Science and Engineering with European Studies, Economics with Mathematics all reach beyond conventional Arts/Science divisions." By this time the original schools had been developed somewhat and were:

 African and Asian Studies (abbreviated to AFRAS)
 Biological Sciences (BIOLS)
 Chemistry and Molecular Sciences (MOLS)
 Cognitive and Computing Sciences (COGS)
 Cultural and Community Studies (CCS)
 Engineering and Applied Sciences (ENGG, formerly EAPS)
 English and American (ENGAM or EAM)
 European Studies (EURO)
 Mathematical and Physical Sciences (MAPS)
 Social Sciences (SOC)

There was also the Institute of Development Studies (IDS). This is still located on Sussex's campus, but is now a separate institution.

In 2001, as the university celebrated its 40th anniversary, the then Vice-Chancellor Alasdair Smith proposed major changes to the curriculum across the "Arts schools", and the senate agreed to structural changes which would create two Arts schools and a "Sussex Institute" in place of the five schools then in place. Corresponding changes would be made in Sciences.

The changes were finally implemented in September 2003.  After discussion in senate and the schools, disciplinary departments which had been located across the different schools, were located firmly within one school, and undergraduates were offered straightforward degree subjects. The multi-disciplinarity provided by the school courses was now to be achieved through elective courses from other departments and schools.

In 2009 the university adopted a new organisational structure. The term "Schools of Studies" was retained, but each was headed by a "Head of School" rather than the traditional "Dean".

In 2020 the School of English, School of History, Art History and Philosophy, and School of Media, Film and Music were merged to create the School of Media, Arts and Humanities.

The schools as of 2020 are listed below.
The term "department" has been retained in some cases, where a school contains separate disciplines.

 School of Engineering and Informatics (two separate schools before 2011)
 School of Life Sciences (includes Biology, Environmental Science, Chemistry and Biochemistry and houses the Centre for Genome Damage and Stability)
 School of Mathematical and Physical Sciences (MPS) (includes Mathematics, Physics and Astronomy) 
 School of Psychology
 School of Education and Social Work (ESW)
 School of Global Studies (includes Anthropology, Geography, International Development and International Relations, as well as interdisciplinary programmes in Development Studies)
 School of Law, Politics and Sociology (LPS)
School of Media, Arts and Humanities (MAH) (three separate schools before 2020)
 University of Sussex Business School

None of these changes have affected the Brighton and Sussex Medical School (BSMS).

The Doctoral School supports PhD student and Post-docs across all schools and departments and supports PhD students and Post-Docs through the Sussex Research hive, the Researcher Development Program, funding schemes as well as its own partnerships.

Chancellors and Vice-Chancellors

The current and fifth Chancellor of the university is Sanjeev Bhaskar, who succeeded Lord Attenborough in 2009.

The university has had nine Vice-Chancellors:

Academic profile

The university, a member of the Erasmus charter, offers over 400 Undergraduate programs, over 210 Postgraduate taught programs and over 70 PhD programs. It is research-led, with around 1,000 teaching and research staff of which around 300 are research-only staff. Additionally, there are over 1200 PhD students at the university distributed across the different Schools. The university fees are at £9,250 per year for home fee status undergraduates, the highest a university can charge in the United Kingdom.

Reputation and rankings

The University of Sussex was ranked 20th in the UK and 160th in the world by the Times Higher Education World University Rankings 2021. The Sunday Times placed the university in 19th place nationally in 2021. The university was ranked 15th in the UK by the Complete University Guide in 2017. The university was ranked 187th in the world according to the QS World University Rankings 2017. The university was ranked 205th the 2018 CWTS Leiden Ranking. Sussex ranked as 66th in the world in 2016 for its sustainability on the UI GreenMetric ranking.

The Complete University guide 2018 ranked Sussex as sixth in the UK for Graduate prospects and 1st in the South East (graduates getting into employment or further study immediately after graduation).

Subject

In subject rankings, it was ranked 1st in the world for development studies in 2021. Ranked 29th in the world in the 2018 Times Higher Education World University Rankings for the social sciences, 11th in Europe and 7th nationally. It ranked as 49th in the world for Law and 48th for Business and Economics. In the same year, it ranked 4th in the UK for Sociology, 7th for Geography, 4th for Politics and International Relations, 10th for Psychology and 2nd for Communication and Media Studies by the Times Higher Education rankings by subject.

The university also ranked in the top 100 in the world for the social sciences in the CWTS Leiden Ranking 2016 and in the top 150 in the world for Social Sciences ARWU 2016 and 90th best in the world for Psychological Sciences in the U.S. News & World Report.

The QS World University Rankings by Subject for 2016, 2017 and 2018 placed the University 1st in the world for Development Studies. Further, it ranked in the world's top 100 for Anthropology, Sociology, Politics and International Studies, History, Geography, English Language and Literature and Communication and Media Studies in the QS 2018 rankings. Other top 150 subject rankings in the world include Education, Economics and Psychology.

Research
In 2017, Sussex's research income was around £65 million. This primarily came from funding body grants and research grants and contracts.

In addition to being home to Institute of Development Studies, Sussex has over 40 university research centres, over 15 strategic research centres and many smaller research clusters. IDS is ranked as 1st in the UK, 2nd International Development Think Tank and 4th university affiliated Think Tank in the world (out of 8,000 think tanks ranked) by the University of Pennsylvania Global Go To Think Tank Index Report 2017.

Sussex research centres include SPRU, the Science Policy Research Unit, which is ranked as 3rd best Science and technology Think Tank in the World (out of 8,000 think tanks ranked by the University of Pennsylvania Global Go To Think Tank Index Report 2017) Other notable centres include the STEPS Centre, the Centre for American Studies and the Sussex European Institute.

The university is one of the UK ESRC's 21 Centres for Doctoral Training, the only institutions accredited in 2010 and capable of receiving ESRC doctoral studentships and funding. The system was updated in 2016 and Doctoral Training Partnerships were established to replace the DTC. In this respect, Sussex is now a member of the Consortium of the Humanities and the Arts-South East England (CHASE) and the South East Network for Social Sciences.

The results of the Research Excellence Framework 2014 show that 98% of research activity at Sussex is categorised as ‘world-leading’ (28%), ‘internationally excellent’ (48%) or ‘internationally recognised’ (22%) in terms of originality, significance and rigour.

Sussex has a number of research collaborations with other Higher Education institutions as well as governmental and non-governmental organisations and institutes around the world. For example, the Harvard Sussex program is a long-standing research collaboration between Sussex and Harvard University focusing on public policy towards chemical and biological weapons. The CBW Conventions Bulletin is a quarterly newsletter published by the HSP. Sussex-Cornell Partnership, the Sussex-Bocconi-Renmin Intrapreneurship Hub and the Sussex-Lund Partnership in Middle Eastern and North African Studies are recent examples. Sussex also co-coordinates the Consortium for the Humanities and the Arts. Sussex is also one of the eight universities of the Tyndall Centre network.

In Europe, Sussex is one of the collaborating institutions of the Paul Scherrer Institute, the largest research institute in Switzerland, focusing on issues of technology and the natural sciences. Sussex is involved with many projects with the EU and with European countries. For example, BAR research is an Anglo-French collaboration between the Sussex, the East Sussex County Council and three French universities.

Nationally, Sussex is involved in a number of partnerships including the Nexus Network (A partnership between Sussex, University of Cambridge and the University of East Anglia) and CIED (a collaboration between Sussex, Oxford University and University of Manchester). The university is also a partner of the Metropolitan Police, with Demos (UK think tank) and Palantir Technologies.

In recent years, the institutes for the study of consciousness science, Centre for Advanced International Theory (CAIT), the institute for the study of corruption and the Middle East studies institute were opened at the university. The university also has a Genome Damage and Stability Centre, a nuclear magnetic resonance facility and a purpose-built apparatus in cryogenic research.

In terms of policy, Sussex is highly involved with the UK government, the UN and governments around the world. For example, the university is a UN Habitat partner. Nationally, the UK Trade Policy Observatory was set up at the university to offer the UK government, the UK industry as well as the public advice in addressing trade issues resulting from Brexit. The university is also one of the UK government's partner institutions on the Arctic Research Program. Similarly, SPRU and IDS are involved in policy recommendations with countries on all five continents.

In 2016, the Transformative Innovation Policy Consortium (TIPC) was set up as a collaboration between the university and the governments of Sweden, Norway, Finland, South Africa and Colombia to research social and economic issues.

The university is also home to a number of academic journals from the IDS Bulletin to The Journal for Ethnic and Migration studies, journal of Experimental Psychopathology, The World Trade Review, Journal of Banking and Finance, International Journal of Innovation Management, Journal of International Humanitarian Legal Studies, European Journal of International Relations and the Child and Family Social Work Journal, among many others.

Admissions

New students entering the university in 2020 had an average of 135 points (the equivalent of AAB at A Level). According to the 2023 Times and Sunday Times Good University Guide, approximately 11% of Sussex's undergraduates come from independent schools.

Educational partners
Brighton and Sussex Medical School (BSMS) results from a partnership between the University of Brighton and the University of Sussex. The school, the first medical school in the South East outside London, gained its licence in 2002 and opened in 2003. The Guardian ranked the medical school as 16th in the UK in 2018.

The Institute of Development Studies offers research, teaching and communications related to international development. IDS originated in 1966 as a research institute based at the university. It is financially and constitutionally independent under the status of a charitable company limited by guarantee.

The Centre for Research in Innovation Management, a research-based school of the University of Brighton, dates from 1990. It was located in the Freeman Centre building but has now moved to the University of Brighton campus.

The Sussex Innovation Centre, an on-campus commercial business centre, opened in 1996. It provides services for the formation and growth of technology- and knowledge-based companies in the South East. It offers a business environment to over 40 companies in the IT, biotech, media and engineering sectors.

Nationally, the university has a number of partner institutions across the UK including Bellerbys College, British and Irish Modern Music Institute (BIMM), University Centre Croydon (UCC, also known as Croydon College), Highbury College Portsmouth, International Study Centre (Study Group), Roffey Park Institute, University of Brighton and West Dean College. These partnerships include both validated courses (designed and delivered by the partner institution but awarded and quality assured by the university) and franchised courses (designed and assessed by the university, but delivered by another institution).

Study Group works in partnership with the university to provide the University of Sussex International Study Centre (ISC). It offers a course of academic subjects, study skills and English-language training for students who wish to study a degree at the university but who do not yet possess the necessary qualifications to start a degree. The ISC course provides students with English-language and academic skills to start at Sussex the following year. In 2018, ISC announced that they will increase their postgraduate and undergraduate offerings by adding 50 new courses across the pre-masters and pathway options on offer.

The British and Irish Modern Music Institute offers BA courses in Modern Musicianship – validated by the university – at its centres in London, Berlin, Hamburg, Brighton, Manchester, Bristol and Birmingham.

Internationally, the university has over 160 partner institutions including the University of British Columbia, University of California, George Washington University, Georgetown University, University of Massachusetts Amherst, University of Michigan Ann Arbor, University of North Carolina Chapel Hill, University of North Carolina at Asheville, University of Pittsburgh, Purdue University, University of Rochester, State University of New York, University of Texas at Austin, University of Washington, Kyoto University, Peking University, Korea University, National Taiwan University (NTU), Université Grenoble Alpes, Aix-Marseille Université, Paris-Sorbonne University, Sciences Po Aix, Sciences Po Paris, University of Strasbourg, Freie Universität Berlin, Humboldt-Universität zu Berlin and the Ludwig Maximilian University of Munich. These are institutions where there are formal agreements for student exchange, research collaborations, staff and faculty mobility and study abroad schemes.

Student life

Sussex Students Union is the main body responsible for the representation of Sussex students. It runs two bars, two shops, a cafe and a number of other outlets and schemes (such as the buddy scheme).

The Student Union runs Falmer Bar, which once hosted bands such as The Who and Northfield Bar. There are 261 student clubs and societies at Sussex, all functioning under the Student Union. Students are also supported through the university, for example through the Student Life Centre which covers problems ranging from financial difficulties to psychological ones.

Like many campus universities, many of the students studying at Sussex live in the city. Students are highly involved in Brighton's life, from its cultural scene to community service. In 2016, Sussex won the AGCAS award for Student engagement.

In 2017, Sussex was ranked as top in the UK for political scene (tied with Cambridge, Oxford, Manchester, Goldsmith and LSE).

Student research
Sussex runs a Junior Researcher scheme in which undergraduate students can receive funding and spend 8 weeks during their summer vacation doing research alongside Sussex researchers and academics. Additionally, a number of independent bursaries for undergraduates to conduct research projects exist within Schools and research centres. In parallel, a competitive International Junior researcher scheme exists to allow students from Sussex's institutional partners, such as Georgetown University, The Chinese University of Hong Kong, and the University of California, Santa Cruz to receive funding and come to Sussex to work on research projects alongside researchers and academics.

Additionally, a number of research groups and networks incorporate advanced undergraduate students into their projects offering them the opportunity to both shadow and actively participate in ongoing research at the university.

At postgraduate level, Sussex offers MA, MS, MRes, PGCert, PGDip, CLNDIP and LLM degrees. All master's degrees are research based and master's students are incorporated with PhD students in the different research centres, clusters and networks across the university and many master's degrees are based in research centres instead of being based in University departments. Further, student research mobility schemes are in place to allow students to conduct research at other institutions across the world.

The university has a number of research-oriented funding schemes (scholarships and fellowships) for master's students, including a Sussex Graduate Scholarship for current undergraduate students at the university. There are also country scholarships for postgraduate students applying from India, Nigeria, Pakistan, Malaysia and Vietnam.

International students and opportunities
In 2016–2017, there were 17,319 students at Sussex, with under 12,000 undergraduates and over 5,000 postgraduates. In total, there are around 5,000 students from outside the EU, the majority of whom are postgraduates. It also has many students from mainland Europe. One in five of its undergraduates study abroad at some point of their education: the majority of its undergraduate courses offer a study abroad year and/or placement. 

Sussex students may also spend a year abroad as part of their degree, in a variety of European institutions through the Erasmus+ programme, as well as North America, Asia, Central and South America, Australia and North Africa.

The university runs the First-Generation Scholars scheme, an award-winning initiative, to support students from lower-economic backgrounds as well as students who are the first to pursue higher education in their families. In 2017, Britain's Labour Party leader Jeremy Corbyn met some First-Generation Scholar students during his visit to the university.

In the OFFA last ranking (2016) Sussex ranked as second in the South east (after Oxford) and sixth in the UK in expenditure on widening participation.

Support at Sussex includes a work-study programme to help students earn money, funded work placements and three years’ aftercare for graduates to help them find a suitable career. The Sussex Plus programme documents and credits students' extracurricular skills.

English Language courses for speakers of other languages are provided by the Language Institute. "English in the Vacation" gives intensive practice in spoken and written English. An International Foundation Year offered by the ISC (Sussex University International Study Centre) offers direct routes to Sussex degrees.

The Sussex International Summer School runs for four and eight weeks starting in July, providing intensive courses. It is predominantly attended by foreign students. The ISS trips office provides excursions to prominent cities, theatres, and activities. Sussex is also home to the Fulbright Sussex Summer institute, a four-week academic program on British culture designed for American Students.

The International Study Centre, run by Study Group International at Sussex offers international Foundation courses, pre-masters and an International Year 1 scheme to prepare students for their degrees. The centre also offers a "Pre-masters" degree for international students.

The Sussex Student Union also runs a series of events in support of international students at Sussex. The union has a Boycott, Divestment and Sanctions policy in all its shops, bars and cafes.

Housing 

Overall, there are nine on-campus university managed accommodations, one off-campus university managed block of flats, one off-campus university managed study lodge and a number of university houses within Brighton and Hove. In 2016, there were over 5000 students living in university accommodation, including all first year students (who are guaranteed accommodation).

Accommodation on campus was expanded in the 1970s with the construction of the unusual split-level flats of East Slope, a development that included social building with a porter's office and bar. From 2017, that development was demolished, being gradually replaced by new housing facilities due for final completion in 2021. When complete, it will include over 2,100 new housing units as well as a new social space. The total build has a budget of £150 Million.

In the 1990s, as student numbers rose, further developments were constructed in the corner of campus between East Slope and Park Village. Brighthelm and Lewes Court were constructed in public-private partnership funding arrangements with the Bradford & Northern and Kelsey Housing Associations.

Two newer accommodation areas were completed in the 2000s: one next to Falmer railway station, named Stanmer Court, and the other next to East Slope, opposite Bramber House, known as Swanborough.

Northfield were constructed at the top end of campus, beyond Lewes Court, which opened in September 2011.

In 2017, East Slope was demolished to create up to date accommodation (also called East Slope) which houses more students, in addition to a new student space. The new East Slope has opened in phases and is due to open in completion by January 2021.

In 2020, the university announced that they plan to replace Park Village and Park Houses (excluding Norwich House) by new accommodation called West Slope as well as creating new facilities including a new library, cafe, supermarket, additional study spaces, and flexible green space. The first phase is projected to be completed by autumn 2022 and this work is projected to be fully completed by 2025. The new accommodation will provide approximately 1000 additional  bedrooms. The university's Sustainability Action Plan released in June 2021 includes plans for increasing the energy efficiency of campus housing and ancillary facilities in an effort to reach net zero by 2035. The plan includes upgrading building energy management systems by August 2022 and assessing if the BREEAM Excellent environmental construction standards are sufficient for new construction by December 2022.

Sport
The university has two sports centres on its campus: the Sussex Sports Centre and the Falmer Sports Complex. There is also one sports shop within the sports centre and one in the Falmer sports complex. The Falmer sports centre alone has over 40 acres of playing field. The university also has agreements with Freedom Leisure, granting its students access to sports centres across West Sussex.

The university competes in the following sports, usually with both men's and women's teams:

Team sports: basketball, cricket, football, field hockey, lacrosse, netball, American football, rugby union, ultimate Frisbee, rowing, and volleyball.
Racquet sports: tennis, table tennis, badminton, and squash.
Individual sports: archery, fencing, swimming, and trampolining.
Outdoor pursuits: sailing, mountain biking, mountaineering, skiing and snowboarding, sub aqua, surfing, and windsurfing.
Martial arts: mixed martial arts, kickboxing, Shaolin Kung Fu, aikido, and sport aikido.

The Falmer Stadium, home to Brighton & Hove Albion F.C., is located near the Sussex campus. A mutual relationship of benefits, including potential usage of the stadium's sporting facilities by the university, was established very early on.

In 2018, the university had 42 sports teams competing in the BUCS.

The Sussex Sports centre also runs a number of courses, from Yoga to Cycling challenges, as well as fundraisers, children's activities and specialized workshops for students and staff. The university also offers sports scholarships, including ones for basketball and Hockey.

Campus media
University Radio Falmer (abbreviated to URF) is one of the first student radio stations in the country, founded in 1976. It now broadcasts via digital audio broadcasting and via the internet. The station is unplaylisted, and broadcasts twenty-four hours a day from its studio in the Grade I listed Falmer House. URF also publishes student articles, interviews and news on its website. It won a bronze award in the "best scripted programming" category in the 2008 UK Student Radio Awards. Alumni of the station include the former BBC Radio Director Helen Boaden, Sky News journalist Kit Bradshaw, and BBC News presenter Clive Myrie.

The Badger is the Union's fortnightly newspaper and is written and designed entirely by Sussex students. The paper is available to students and staff during term-time, covering news and sport on campus, as well as comment pieces, features, lifestyle and arts coverage. It also publishes content online. The Badger began in October 1995, having formerly been known as Unionews since the 1970s. The paper has since covered a variety of stories, including several on-campus occupations and the expulsion of five Sussex students for involvement in protests.

University of Sussex Student Television (abbreviated to UniTV) is a student television channel, launched in September 2010. UniTV is a member of NaSTA (National Student Television Association) and has won 7 NaSTA awards in the past three years.

Notable people

Notable alumni

Notable staff

In the sciences, Sussex counts among its past and present faculty five Nobel Prize winners: Sir Anthony Leggett, Sir Paul Nurse, Archer Martin, Sir John Cornforth and Sir Harry Kroto. John Maynard Smith, FRS, founding father of Sussex Biology was honoured with the Crafoord Prize and the Kyoto Prize for his contributions to Evolutionary Biology.

The university has 15 Fellows of the Royal Society. These include Geoffrey Cloke (Inorganic Chemistry); Michael F. Land (Animal Vision – Frink Medal); Michael Lappert (Inorganic Chemistry); John Murrell (Theoretical Chemistry); Laurence Pearl (Structural Biology) and Guy Richardson (Neuroscience). Additionally, two of its faculty have received the Leontief Prize: Michael Lipton and Mariana Mazzucato.

In the Humanities and Social sciences, there are ten members of faculty who have the distinction of being Fellows of the British Academy. Staff with FBAs include Donald Winch (economics), Peter Burke (historian), Craig Clunas, Peter France, Barry Supple, Margaret Boden, Pat Thane, John Barrell.

Other prominent academics on the staff of the university have included; Geoffrey Bennington; Homi K. Bhabha (postcolonialism); Ranajit Guha (founder of Subaltern studies), Jonathan Dollimore (Renaissance literature, gender and queer studies); Katy Gardner (social anthropology); Gabriel Josipovici (Dante, the Bible); Jacqueline Rose (feminism, psychoanalysis); Nicholas Royle (modern literature and theory; deconstruction); Alan Sinfield (Shakespeare, sexuality, queer theory); Martin Rees, Baron Rees of Ludlow (Cosmologist); Brian Street (anthropology); John D. Barrow (Cosmologist); Leon Mestel (Astronomer); Gavin Ashenden (Senior Lecturer in English, University Chaplain, broadcaster and Chaplain to Queen Elizabeth II);, Keith Pavitt (science and technology policy), and Christopher Freeman (Economist).

Current notable staff (in addition to a number of those mentioned above) include economist Richard Tol, psychologist Andy Field (academic), biologist Dave Goulson, sociologist Gerard Delanty, development economist Sir Richard Jolly, astrophysicist and writer John Gribbin, historian Robin Milner-Gulland, scholar Edward Timms, author Gabriel Josipovici, geographer Melissa Leach, psychologist Dame Leslie Fallowfield, Brian Bates (psychologist), biologist Laurence Pearl, historian Maurice Howard, Sociologist Jennifer Platt, Dame Denise Holt, policymaker Andy Stirling, political economist Mick Moore, pharmacist Bugewa Apampa, anthropologist Philip Proudfoot and experimental physicist Antonella De Santo.

Arms
The university's coat of arms was officially granted on 15 March 1962. It built on Sussex's history and features: two Saxon crowns and a sable (black) dolphin. The arms also features six martlets or heraldic swallows, as per the traditional emblem of East and West Sussex counties. On either side of the arms are two pelicans, head bowed down, each standing upon a book and supporting a staff.

Since 2011, the coat of arms is only used by the graduation team and on official university degrees. For all other purposes, the US logo is used.

See also
Armorial of UK universities
List of universities in the United Kingdom
Plate glass university

References

External links

 University of Sussex website
 Brighton and Sussex Medical School
 University of Sussex Students' Union website

 
Sussex, University of
Educational institutions established in 1961
1961 establishments in England
Sussex